Astrakhan is a Russian Air Force air base located near Astrakhan, Astrakhan Oblast, Russia.

In August 1956, the 393rd Guards Fighter Aviation Baranovichi Red Banner Order of Suvorov 3rd degree Regiment was transferred to this airfield.

In August 1958 the creation of the 228th Mixed Aviation Regiment (Military Unit Number 28025) began in Mozdok in the North Ossetian Autonomous Soviet Socialist Republic, North Caucasus Military District. In April 1960 it moved to Astrakhan, as it was intended for combat training at the Ashuluk Range.

6.60 renamed 228th Training Aviation Regiment.
The base is home to the 116th Centre for Combat Employment of Air Defence Aviation which uses the Mikoyan MiG-29 under the 185th Centre for Combat Application and Combat Training for the Air Force.

References

Russian Air Force bases